Calhoun is an unincorporated community and census-designated place in Ouachita Parish, Louisiana, United States. It is named after Archibald Calhoun, who was an original settler and landowner. Its elevation is 177 feet (54 m), and it is located at  (32.5126469, -92.3584744). Calhoun is unincorporated (no local government) and is governed by the parish through a board of commissioners known as the Police Jury. It is a census designated place and at the time of the most recent United States Census Survey, the population was 1,965.

Calhoun is located in a rural area with a landscape mixture of hills and woodlands on the former transcontinental route U.S. 80 near Interstate 20, approximately 10 miles west of West Monroe. It has experienced a large growth in population recently, due to many retail, restaurant, and entertainment venues nearby, as well as three local universities, but it also attracts young families raising children due to four public schools located in the community that all consistently place in the top percentile in achievement.

Former U.S. Representative Newt V. Mills of Louisiana was born in Calhoun, as was the late Caddo Parish Sheriff James M. Goslin.
 
Arkansas Republican former state chairman Ken Coon was reared in Calhoun.

Zach Dasher, a candidate for Louisiana's 5th congressional district seat in the November 4 primary election, resides in Calhoun.

Demographics

2020 census

As of the 2020 United States census, there were 670 people, 135 households, and 121 families residing in the CDP.

Climate

According to the Köppen Climate Classification system, Calhoun has a humid subtropical climate, abbreviated "Cfa" on climate maps.

References

External links 

Census-designated places in Louisiana
Census-designated places in Ouachita Parish, Louisiana
Census-designated places in Monroe, Louisiana metropolitan area